Broken Strings may mean:
"Broken Strings" (song) by James Morrison featuring Nelly Furtado
Broken Strings (film), a 1940 film
 strings (music), strings used in musical instruments